Air Raid Serenades is a greatest hits compilation album from Swedish garage rock band The Hellacopters, released in August 2006. The album has tracks from all of the band's previous albums, plus some songs that had previously appeared on EPs and other between-album releases.

Track listing
 "(Gotta Get Some Action) Now!" – 3:16 
 from the album Supershitty to the Max!
 "Ferrytale" – 3:11
 from the EP Disappointment Blues
 "Born Broke" – 4:10
 from the album Supershitty to the Max!
 "Soulseller" – 3:12
 from the album Payin' the Dues
 "You Are Nothing" – 2:38
 from the album Payin' the Dues
 "Like No Other Man" – 3:13
 from the album Payin' the Dues
 "Long Gone Losers" – 2:45
 from the EP Disappointment Blues
 "Move Right out of Here" – 2:09
 from the album Grande Rock
 "The Devil Stole the Beat from the Lord" – 3:53
 from the album Grande Rock
 "Venus in Force" – 3:00
 from the album Grande Rock
 "Down Right Blue" – 4:32
 previously vinyl-only
 "Crimson Ballroom" – 4:05
 previously a limited-edition promotional release
 "Hopeless Case of a Kid in Denial" – 3:02
 from the album High Visibility
 "Toys and Flavors" – 3:33
 from the album High Visibility
 "No Song Unheard" – 4:00
 from the album High Visibility
 "By the Grace of God" – 3:04
 from the album By the Grace of God
 "Carry Me Home" – 3:41
 from the album By the Grace of God
 "It's Good But It Just Ain't Right" – 2:51
 from the album By the Grace of God
 "Turn the Wrong Key" – 2:24
 from the EP Strikes Like Lightning
 "Everything's on T.V." – 3:14
 from the album Rock & Roll Is Dead
 "I'm in the Band" – 3:18
 from the album Rock & Roll Is Dead
 "Bring It on Home" – 4:42
 from the album Rock & Roll Is Dead

Personnel 

Nicke Andersson – guitar, vocals
Jon Average – backing vocals
Mattias Bärjed – acoustic guitar, backing vocals
David Bianco – mixing
Stefan Boman – engineer, mixing
Olle Carlsson – photography
Robert Dahlqvist – guitar, backing vocals
Robert Eriksson – drums, backing vocals
Janne Hansson – engineer
Michael Ilbert – engineer, mixing
Henrik Jonsson – mastering
Chips K. – producer, engineer
Anders Lind – engineer
Anders Møller – percussion, engineer, mixing
Scott Morgan – guitar, vocals
Daniel Rey – guitar, engineer, mixing
Knut Schreiner – guitar, engineer, mixing
Tomas Skogsberg – engineer, mixing

External links
 Official website

The Hellacopters albums
2006 compilation albums